The 2018–19 season was Club Atlético River Plate's 8th consecutive season in the top-flight of Argentine football. The season covers the period from 1 July 2018 to 30 June 2019.

Squad Summer

Squad Winter

Transfers

Out Summer

In Winter

Out Winter

Loan Out

Friendlies

Winter pre-season

Mid-season

Competitions

Overall

Results summary

Results by round

Primera División

League table

References 

Club Atlético River Plate seasons
River Plate
River